Saurabh Srivastava may refer to:
Saurabh Srivastava (entrepreneur), Indian entrepreneur, investment professional, and institution builder
Saurabh Srivastava (politician), Indian politician, member of Uttar Pradesh Legislative Assembly